Sun Lih-chyun (born 21 October 1961) is a Taiwanese politician. He currently serves as the spokesperson of the Executive Yuan.

Education
Sun obtained his bachelor's degree in economics from Soochow University in 1984. He then obtained his master's degree in economics and doctoral degree in agricultural economics from Michigan State University in the United States in 1988 and 1993, respectively.

Early career
Sun was an adjunct associate professor in the department of economics of National Chung Hsing University in 1993–1994. He then became the associate professor of the department of agriculture economics of National Taiwan University.

References

1961 births
Living people
Michigan State University alumni
Political office-holders in the Republic of China on Taiwan
Soochow University (Taiwan) alumni